The Affiliated High School of Shanxi University is a public, co-educational day school in Taiyuan, Shanxi province. It was founded in 1955.

External links
Official website of The Affiliated High School of Shanxi University

References

Education in Taiyuan
Schools in Shanxi
Shanxi University